Strashnaya is a rural locality (a village) in Gamovskoye Rural Settlement, Permsky District, Perm Krai, Russia. The population was 21 as of 2010.

Geography 
Strashnaya is located 22 km southwest of Perm (the district's administrative centre) by road. Gusyata is the nearest rural locality.

References 

Rural localities in Permsky District